The 2000 Fed Cup was the 38th edition of the most important competition between national teams in women's tennis.

Changes were made to the World Group; instead of two groups of eight teams, there was one group of thirteen. The group was divided in three round-robin pools of four, with the winner of each pool joining defending champions the United States in a knockout bracket. In the final, the United States defeated Spain at the Mandalay Bay Events Center in Las Vegas, Nevada, United States, on 24–25 November, giving the United States their 17th title.

World Group

 Nations in bold advanced to the higher level of competition.

Pool A
 
 
 
 

Pool B
 
 
 
 

Pool C

Draw

Americas Zone

 Nations in bold advanced to the higher level of competition.
 Nations in italics were relegated down to a lower level of competition.

Group I
Venue: Santinho Coast, Florianópolis, Brazil (outdoor clay)

Dates: 25–30 April

Participating Teams

Group II
Venue: Maya C.C., La Libertad, El Salvador (outdoor clay)

Dates: 9–13 May

Participating Teams

Asia/Oceania Zone

 Nations in bold advanced to the higher level of competition.
 Nations in italics were relegated down to a lower level of competition.

Group I
Venue: Utsubo Tennis Center, Osaka, Japan (outdoor hard)

Dates: 25–30 April

Participating Teams

Group II
Venue: Utsubo Tennis Center, Osaka, Japan (outdoor hard)

Dates: 25–29 April

Participating Teams

 
 
 
 
 Pacific Oceania

Europe/Africa Zone

 Nations in bold advanced to the higher level of competition.
 Nations in italics were relegated down to a lower level of competition.

Group I
Venue: La Manga Club, Murcia, Spain (outdoor clay)

Dates: 15–20 May

Participating Teams

Group II
Venue: Estoril T.C., Estoril, Portugal (outdoor clay)

Dates: 28 March – 1 April

Participating Teams

External links 
 Fed Cup

 
Billie Jean King Cups by year
Fed
2000 in women's tennis